International Post Corporation (IPC) is a cooperative association of 25 national postal services from major countries in Europe, Asia Pacific and North America. IPC's main activities are providing assistance to its postal members, whose businesses activities include mail, parcels, express, logistics, retail and banking services.

IPC was founded in 1989 and since then its main activities have been to upgrade quality and service performance, to develop technology to help members improve service for international letters, parcels and express, and to provide industry intelligence and platforms for cooperation between posts. Its headquarters are in Brussels, Belgium.

Membership and governance

Membership 

IPC members represent postal operators from Europe, North America and the Asia-Pacific region. IPC Shareholding Members are allocated a minimum number of shares based on their total addressed mail volumes (i.e. total letter mail handled and delivered inside and outside the organisation’s home country, excluding unaddressed mail and newspapers but including magazines). All IPC members should have a universal service obligation for the provision of mail services although the Board is authorised to admit members without such an obligation.
IPC’s current members are:

Governance 
IPC is a cooperative company governed by a Board, composed of the chief executive officers from eleven IPC members plus IPC's president and chief executive. The board is chaired by Dag Medjell.
IPC’s current CEO is Holger Winklbauer.

Mission and activities 
International Post Corporation was founded in 1989 and is headquartered in Brussels, Belgium. 
IPC was founded with a double role: provide a platform to exchange intelligence between its member posts, and develop and support systems to improve international mail services through quality of service and interoperability.

IPC’s main activities include:

 Upgrading international mail quality
 Providing industry intelligence and research
 Providing platforms for senior management

Mail quality 

IPC’s core activity is to develop and provide technological solutions to support member postal operators in achieving quality of service performance requirements. These services focus on upgrading and maintaining member posts’ end-to-end performance for cross-border mail through monitoring and streamlining international mail processes.

IPC deploys a number of technology infrastructures and systems such as radio frequency identification (RFID), item monitoring and a harmonised customer service system (CSS), which provide transparency in international mail movements, provision of full operational information and data for calculating intercompany payments, detailed enquiry processing and quality of service performance results.

IPC also focuses on key areas for the postal sector like, e-commerce, intercompany pricing and sustainability. In 2009, the company launched its sector-wide sustainability programme, which aimed at reducing the carbon emissions of its participants by 20% by 2020 - a target which was attained in 2018. The company is also a signatory to the UN Global Compact.

Market research 
IPC’s marketing function focuses on creating intelligence on market developments and sharing best practice between posts. Through the close relation with the postal industry, IPC carries out research and gathers intelligence within the postal industry. Some the areas analysed are direct marketing, e-commerce, digital business and environmental sustainability.

Collaboration 
IPC is a cooperative member organisation and as such one of its goals is to provide a framework for networking and knowledge sharing by establishing platforms. These platforms bring together senior postal executives across a range of functions and facilitate further postal operator cooperation by leading groups dedicated to developing solutions to specific cross-border market requirements.

References 

 Dec 10, 2009 Postal groups in emissions pledge. Financial Times

Postal organizations
Postal services
International trade associations
International organisations based in Belgium